David Lawrence Smith  (born 12 October 1943) is a former Australian politician who was a Labor Party member of the Legislative Assembly of Western Australia from 1983 to 1996. He served as a minister in the governments of Peter Dowding and Carmen Lawrence.

Smith was born in Bunbury, Western Australia. He attended Marist Brothers' St Francis Xavier's boys school in Bunbury and St Ildephonsus college in New Norcia. After graduating from high school he studied law at the University of Western Australia. A member of the Labor Party since 1967,  he contested the seat of Bunbury at the 1977 state election, but lost to the sitting Liberal member, John Sibson. Smith served on the City of Bunbury council from 1979 to 1983, before being elected to the seat of Mitchell at the 1983 state election. After the 1989 election, he was appointed to the Dowding ministry as Minister for Justice, Minister for Community Services, and Minister for the South-West. Smith was retained in the ministry when Carmen Lawrence succeeded Peter Dowding as premier in February 1990, with the same titles. Following a reshuffle in February 1991, he was replaced as Minister for Community Services by Eric Ripper, but was additionally made Minister for Lands, Minister for Planning, and Minister for Local Government. Smith lost his ministerial titles after Labor's defeat at the 1993 election, but remained in parliament until his retirement at the 1996 election. Between 2005 and 2013, he was the mayor of Bunbury.

Personal life

David Smith's mother was Evelyn Smith, who is renowned for her special relationship with local dolphins. He is married to Tresslyn Smith, a councillor with the City of Bunbury. He has three adult children: Matthew, Nicholas and Penelope; and two grandchildren: Josie and Dylan. He is a Catholic.

References

|-

|-

1943 births
Living people
Australian Labor Party members of the Parliament of Western Australia
20th-century Australian lawyers
Australian Roman Catholics
Members of the Western Australian Legislative Assembly
People from Bunbury, Western Australia
University of Western Australia alumni
Recipients of the Medal of the Order of Australia
Western Australian local councillors
Mayors of Bunbury, Western Australia